Duckie Brown is a New York-based fashion line.  It was founded in 2001 by Steven Cox and Daniel Silver. Duckie Brown's mission, “dressing men beautifully," is accomplished through hand tailoring, unique fabrics, and bold colors.

History and Operations
Duckie Brown was started as a men's fashion label in 2001 and, in January 2014, it started a women's fashion line.

Collaborations

Perry Ellis by Duckie Brown 

In 2012, Perry Ellis International tapped Duckie Brown to create a designer menswear collection, called Perry Ellis by Duckie Brown.  Duckie Brown's collection for Perry Ellis is shown at New York Fashion week.  The collection aims to look at the future of American sportswear and is sold at luxury retailers around the world.

Florsheim by Duckie Brown 

Duckie Brown partnered up with Florsheim Shoes in 2009 to create a line of men's designer shoes.  The collection is based on a marriage of Florsheim's tradition and quality with Duckie Brown's forward thinking  vision to propose a new means of dressing for the contemporary man.  The shoes can be found online and in stores at luxury retailers around the world.

Awards
In 2007, Duckie Brown was nominated by the Council of Fashion Designers of America (CFDA) for its Menswear Designer of the Year award, alongside Ralph Lauren and Calvin Klein. At some time, Daniel Silver and Steven Cox won a CFDA Award.

External links
 Duckie Brown
 Duckie Brown Journal
 Florsheim by Duckie Brown

References 

 http://men.style.com/
 http://www.cfda.com

American fashion designers
Menswear designers
2001 establishments in New York (state)